Transpetrol is a Slovak company involved in the transportation and storage of crude oil. It provides both transit and domestic transport to the end customer.

The Slovak Republic owns through the Slovak Economy Ministry 100% of the company.

Transpetrol is the operator of the Slovak section of the Druzhba pipeline and it is the only operator of the oil pipeline system in Slovakia.

Statistics
In 2006, the company transported a total of 11,145,000 tonnes of  crude oil.
5,660,000 tonnes to Slovnaft;
5,218,000 tonnes to refineries at Litvínov and Pardubice in the Czech Republic;
267,000 tonnes to other companies.

Besides transporting oil, Transpetrol is also involved in the storage of oil having a total storage capacity of 520,000 m.3

Corporate governance
Transpetrol is under the current management since 15 June 2020. The company's board of directors consists of: Ján Horkovič (chairman), Martin Ružinský (vice-chairman), Milan Rác, Marián Lokša and Peter Zelinka.

See also
 Energy in Slovakia
 Economy of Slovakia

References

Literature

External links
Company website  (Slovak)

Oil and gas companies of Slovakia
Oil pipeline companies
Companies of Czechoslovakia